Bartholomaeus Pitiscus (also Barthélemy or Bartholomeo; August 24, 1561 – July 2, 1613) was a 16th-century German trigonometrist, astronomer and theologian who first coined the word trigonometry.

Biography
Pitiscus was born to poor parents in Grünberg (now Zielona Góra, Poland), then part of the Duchy of Glogau/Głogów, one of the Habsburg-ruled Duchies of Silesia.

He studied theology in Zerbst and Heidelberg. A Calvinist, he was appointed to teach the ten-year-old Frederick IV, Elector Palatine of the Rhine, by Frederick's Calvinist uncle Johann Casimir of Simmern, as Frederick's father had died in 1583. Pitiscus was subsequently appointed court chaplain at Breslau (Wrocław) and court preacher to Frederick. Pitiscus supported Frederick's subsequent measures against the Roman Catholic Church.

Pitiscus achieved fame with his influential work written in Latin, called Trigonometria: sive de solutione triangulorum tractatus brevis et perspicuus (1595, first edition printed in Heidelberg), which introduced  the word trigonometry to the English and French languages, translations into which had appeared in 1614 and 1619, respectively. It consists of five books on plane and spherical trigonometry. Pitiscus is sometimes credited with inventing the decimal point, the symbol separating integers from decimal fractions, which appears in his trigonometrical tables and was subsequently accepted by John Napier in his logarithmic papers (1614 and 1619).

Pitiscus edited Thesaurus mathematicus (1613) in which he improved the trigonometric tables of Georg Joachim Rheticus and also corrected Rheticus’s Magnus Canon doctrinæ triangulorum.

Pitiscus died in Heidelberg. The lunar crater Pitiscus is named after him.

The classical scholar Samuel Pitiscus (1637–1727) was his nephew.

Works

Notes

References
 S. Gottwald, H.-J. Ilgauds, K.-H. Schlote (Hrsg.): Lexikon bedeutender Mathematiker. Verlag Harri Thun, Frankfurt a. M. 1990

External links
 
 Allgemeine Deutsche Biographie :de:s:ADB:Pitiscus, Bartholomaeus

1561 births
1613 deaths
People from Austrian Silesia
16th-century German astronomers
16th-century German mathematicians
17th-century German mathematicians
German Calvinist and Reformed ministers
People from Zielona Góra
16th-century German writers
16th-century German male writers
17th-century German writers
17th-century German male writers